Zeidane Ould Hmeida (born 1955?) is a Mauritanian politician. He was appointed Minister of Industry and Mines on November 4, 2001, by president Maaouya Ould Sid'Ahmed Taya. On March 29, 2005, he was appointed Minister of Oil and Energy, a new portfolio. Following Taya's fall from power in August 2005, Hmeida lost his ministerial position and was arrested for 'economic crimes'.<ref>{{cite web |url=https://www.justice.gov/sites/default/files/eoir/legacy/2014/10/14/MRT101577.FE.pdf |title=Mauritania: The country's situation, including the human rights situation and the
political situation |date=16 August 2006 |website=https://www.justice.gov |publisher=Immigration and Refugee Board of Canada |access-date=14 March 2021

Since May 13, 2014 he has served as a presidential advisor, under both Mohamed Ould Abdel Aziz and current head of state Mohamed Ould Ghazouani.

References

Living people
Year of birth uncertain
Government ministers of Mauritania
Year of birth missing (living people)